Jan Opaliński (1581–1637) of Łodzia coat of arms, son of Jan Opaliński (1546–1598) and Barbara z Ostroroga Lwowska, brother of Piotr Opaliński, was the head of Opaliński family in the 17th century. Voivode of Poznań since 1628, castellan of Kalisz since 1624, starost of Inowrocław, pious Catholic and supporter of Society of Jesus, he gathered much wealth.

1581 births
1637 deaths
Polish Roman Catholics
Jan 1581